Augie is a masculine nickname.

Augie may also refer to:

Amina Augie (born 1953), Nigerian justice of the Supreme Court of Nigeria
Augie, Nigeria, a Local Government Area
Augie Award, an honor granted by the Culinary Institute of America
"Auggies", a nickname for the sports teams of Augsburg University, Minneapolis, Minnesota, a private liberal arts college
Augustana College (South Dakota), a liberal arts college referred to casually as "Augie"
Augie's Jazz Bar, former name of Smoke (jazz club), a music venue in New York City